Dehlor (also Romanized as Deh-e Lor; also known as Deh-e Lūr, Deh-i-Lur, and Dehlūr) is a village in Murcheh Khvort Rural District, in the Central District of Shahin Shahr and Meymeh County, Isfahan Province, Iran. At the 2006 census, its population was 46, in 18 families.

References 

Populated places in Shahin Shahr and Meymeh County